Robert Cawdrey (ca. 1538 – after 1604) was an English clergyman who produced one of the first dictionaries of the English language, the Table Alphabeticall, in 1604.

Career
Robert Cawdrey did not attend university, but became a school teacher in Oakham, Rutland, in 1563. In 1565, Cawdrey was ordained deacon and priest in 1570, and on 22 October 1571, he was made rector of South Luffenham in Rutland. However, Cawdrey was sympathetic to Puritan teachings, and got in trouble with the Church authorities. In 1576 he was chastised for not reading the approved texts in his sermons, and in 1578 he performed a marriage even though he was not authorized to do so, and was briefly suspended. His suspension lasted only a few months but, in 1586, he was again in trouble for violating the rules and was called before his bishop, Richard Howland. He had powerful friends, among them his patron Lord Burghley, who tried to defend him, but he was deprived of his rectory in 1588 and had to return to teaching to support himself.

Writing
With the assistance of his son Thomas Cawdrey (1575–1640), who was a school teacher in London, Robert Cawdrey decided to create an instructional text; the Table Alphabeticall, which appeared in 1604 when Cawdrey was living in Coventry.

As many new words were entering the English language in the 16th century, Cawdrey became concerned that people would become confused. Cawdrey worried that the wealthy were adopting foreign words and phrases, and wrote that "they forget altogether their mothers language, so that if some of their mothers were alive, they were not able to tell or understand what they say." He also described how "far journied gentlemen" learn new words while in foreign lands, and then "pouder their talke with over-sea language."

Thomas Cawdrey worked on improvements to the Table Alphabeticall.

While he was a rector, Robert Cawdrey wrote A Short and Fruitefull Treatise of the Profit of Catechising in 1580. He revised this work and published a second edition in 1604. Cawdrey also published A Treasurie or Store-House of Similes in 1600, and again in 1609.

A Table Alphabeticall
The full name of his famous dictionary is 

His dictionary contained about 2,500 words. He was careful to explain the alphabetical order to his readers, which even the most literate of his readers would not know or expect; "Nowe if the word, which thou art desirous to finde, begin with (a) then looke in the beginning of this Table, but if with (v) looke towards the end."

Cawdrey dedicated the Table Alphabeticall to five daughters of Lucy Sidney, Lady Harington; Sarah, Lady Hastings, Theodosia, Lady Dudley, Elizabeth, Lady Montagu, Frances, Lady Leigh, and Mary, Lady Wingfield.

Life
Robert Cawdrey had many sons. His youngest son Daniel Cawdrey (ca. 1588-1664) was a Puritan minister.

References

 The Acorn of the Oak: A Stylistic Approach to Lexicographical Method in Cawdrey's A Table Alphabeticall, Raymond G. Siemens, CCH Working Papers, vol. 4 (1994) and in Dictionnairique et lexicographie, Paris, Didier Érudition, vol. 3: Informatique et dictionnaires anciens (1995).

Further reading
 Brent L. Nelson, "The Social Context of Rhetoric, 1500-1660," The Dictionary of Literary Biography, Volume 281: British Rhetoricians and Logicians, 1500-1660, Second Series, Detroit: Gale, 2003, pp. 355–377.
 Janet Bately, ‘Cawdrey, Robert (b. 1537/8?, d. in or after 1604)’, Oxford Dictionary of National Biography, Oxford University Press, 2004, accessed 23 Sept 2008

External links
 The full Table Alphabeticall on University of Toronto Libraries site.

English lexicographers
1530s births
17th-century deaths
People from Oakham
16th-century English writers
16th-century male writers
17th-century English writers
17th-century English male writers
People from South Luffenham